Happiness is the debut studio album released by pop-folk band the Weepies. It was released independently by the band on November 29, 2003.

Promotion

The song "All That I Want" is featured in a series of 2007 J.C. Penney Christmas commercials. It was also featured in a season 1 episode of the hit TV series Gossip Girl. It was also used in a Webkinz Christmas commercial.

The song "Somebody Loved" is featured in the 2004 Todd Solondz film, Palindromes. It is also featured in episode 3 of the second season of Dirty Sexy Money in a scene where the Weepies appear as themselves, performing the song.

The song "Happiness" is featured in the episode "Informed Consent" from the third season of TV series House M.D..

Track listing

References

External links
The Weepies Official Home Page
Happiness on CD Baby
Happiness on Amazon.com

2003 debut albums
The Weepies albums